Benabena (Bena) is a Papuan language spoken in the Goroka District of Eastern Highlands Province, Papua New Guinea.

References

External links 
 Benabena dictionary

Kainantu–Goroka languages
Languages of Eastern Highlands Province